O Bag is an Italian fashion brand established in 2009 under the name Fullspot. Initially, its main focus was producing watches but it has now branched out to bags and a range of fashion accessories. Its products are characterised by minimalist and modular design, allowing for customisation of the product.

Origin
O Bag was founded in 2009 in Padua and its products was first exhibited at the Milan International Exhibition in 2010. O Bag is present in over 50 countries worldwide. After releasing the O clock, O Bag released a pocket watch, the O chive and a range of bags, the O bag. O Bag opened its first branded store in 2011 in Venice.

Source of the 'O'
Every product made by O Bag to date has had an 'O' in front of the product. This comes from the first of O Bag's products which was named the 'O Clock', much like the usual way of expressing the time in English. The company kept the 'O' as a way of identifying its products, much like the 'i' in Apple products.

Products
O Bag developed the O clock in 2010, a watch with a silicone strap and interchangeable faces. The original face of the watch, now called 'O clock Classic' consisted of a plain white face without numbers. The face can be removed from the strap allowing the colour of the strap or face to be changed. There were originally 15 straps but this has grown to 29 which are still in production. O Bag's watch packaging takes inspiration from the tin can, a cylindrical tin with a ring pull. 
O clock developed into a series with the Tone on Tone range consisting of 21 watch face colours to mix and match with 21 straps making a total of 441 possible combinations with Tone on Tone. Other O clock ranges include Camouflage, 80’ clock, Disney, Gold & Silver, Mirror, Numbers, Flower Power and Safari.

In 2011 O Bag released a pocket watch, calling it the O chive. This maintains the minimalist design of the O clock range with a plain white face and the inclusion of a seconds hand. The O chive is made of a soft-touch plastic shell and a white matt-varnished metal chain and clip. There were originally 10 colours  but the three 80' clock colours were added, bringing the total to 13. The plastic shell can be removed and replaced with another colour much like the O clock faces. The packaging is based on a shoe polish container.

In 2012 O Bag released the O bag (the product from which the company is now named), which is fully customizable, much like O Bag's previous products. The O bag is made from an elastomeric foam which comes in 20 different colours, most of which derive from the O clock colour range. The bag's handles and interior can be customised with a variety of materials and colours.

Special Editions
O bag collaborated with Disney, developing a range of watch faces with some of Disney's most famous characters.

Gallery

References

External links

Products introduced in 2009
Bags (fashion)
Watch brands